Fraxinus berlandieriana, the Mexican ash, is a tree native to eastern and northeastern Mexico and to the south-central United States. It has been reported from Tamaulipas, Veracruz, Texas, New Mexico, Oklahoma, Louisiana and Mississippi.

Like other species in the section Melioides, Fraxinus berlandieriana is dioecious, with male and female flowers produced on separate individuals.

References

External links
photo of herbarium specimen at Missouri Botanical Garden, Berlandier, Jean Louis - 2548, syntype of  Fraxinus berlandieriana
photo of herbarium specimen at Missouri Botanical Garden, Berlandier, Jean Louis - 602, syntype of  Fraxinus berlandieriana

Trees of Tamaulipas
Trees of Veracruz
Flora of Oklahoma
Flora of New Mexico
Flora of Texas
Flora of Mississippi
Flora of Louisiana
Plants described in 1844
berlandieriana
Dioecious plants
Flora without expected TNC conservation status